Canaules-et-Argentières is commune in the Gard department in southern France. It is located deep in the French wine-producing region of Languedoc.

Population

Amenities
Shopping in Canaules : There is a friendly cafe/bar/restaurant, Le Canaules, which is open Tuesday-Saturday and where you can also get your fresh bread etc.

In addition, the village of Canaules, is surrounded by other small villages and towns which have an abundance of places for eating and drinking.

See also
Communes of the Gard department

References

External links

 Canaules info

Communes of Gard